Joseph Cooke Jr. (August 14, 1948 – November 12, 2006) was a professional basketball player. He played college basketball for the Indiana Hoosiers and played for the Cleveland Cavaliers during their inaugural 1970–71 season. In 73 games, he averaged 9.9 minutes and 4.3 points per game.

References

External links

1948 births
2006 deaths
African-American basketball players
American men's basketball players
Basketball players from Ohio
Cleveland Cavaliers draft picks
Cleveland Cavaliers players
Indiana Hoosiers men's basketball players
Shooting guards
Sportspeople from Toledo, Ohio
20th-century African-American sportspeople
21st-century African-American people